Rivoli was a  of the French Navy.
Rivoli was built in the Arsenal of Venice, whose harbour was too shallow for a 74-gun to exit. To allow her to depart, she was fitted with seacamels.

On her maiden journey, under Jean-Baptiste Barré, the British 74-gun third-rate  intercepted her on 22 February 1812. Her crew was inexperienced, and in the ensuing Battle of Pirano, the British captured Rivoli after some 400 men of her crew of over 800 were killed or wounded.

The Royal Navy subsequently recommissioned her as HMS Rivoli.

Notes, citations, and references

Notes

Citations

References 
 HMS Rivoli

External links
 

Ships of the line of the French Navy
Téméraire-class ships of the line
1810 ships
Ships built by the Venetian Arsenal
Captured ships